Lassi Järvenpää (born 28 October 1996) is a Finnish professional footballer who plays for Lahti, as a right back.

Career
Järvenpää signed with IFK Mariehamn for the 2019, on a season long deal with an option to extend the deal with one year.

On 15 November 2021, he signed with Lahti for the 2022 season.

References

External links

1996 births
Living people
Finnish footballers
Klubi 04 players
Helsingin Jalkapalloklubi players
Rovaniemen Palloseura players
IFK Mariehamn players
FC Inter Turku players
FC Lahti players
Veikkausliiga players
Kakkonen players
Association football defenders
Footballers from Helsinki
21st-century Finnish people